Akunk is a village in the Talin Municipality of the Aragatsotn Province of Armenia founded in 1829.

References 

Report of the results of the 2001 Armenian Census

Populated places in Aragatsotn Province

Populated places established in 1829